Operation Scorpion was a joint United States–Iraqi air assault offensive targeting insurgents near the city of Kirkuk in northern Iraq. It was led by an Iraqi command and targeted 8 villages in the area. By the end of the operation, around 52 suspected insurgents were detained.

Military operations of the Iraq War involving the United States
Military operations of the Iraq War involving Iraq
Military operations of the Iraq War in 2006
Iraqi insurgency (2003–2011)